Lionneta is a genus of spiders in the family Oonopidae. It was first described in 1979 by Benoit. , it contains 8 species, all of them from the Seychelles.

Species
Lionneta comprises the following species:
Lionneta gerlachi Saaristo, 2001
Lionneta mahensis Benoit, 1979
Lionneta orophila (Benoit, 1979)
Lionneta praslinensis Benoit, 1979
Lionneta savyi (Benoit, 1979)
Lionneta sechellensis Benoit, 1979
Lionneta silhouettei Benoit, 1979
Lionneta veli Saaristo, 2002

References

Oonopidae
Araneomorphae genera
Spiders of Africa